The men's team épée was one of seven fencing events on the fencing at the 1948 Summer Olympics programme. It was the eighth appearance of the event. The competition was held from 5 August 1948 to 6 August 1948. 113 fencers from 21 nations competed.

The competition format continued the pool play round-robin from prior years. Each of the four fencers from one team would face each of the four from the other, for a total of 16 bouts per match. Bouts were to three touches. The team that won more bouts won the match, with competition potentially stopping when one team reached 9 points out of the possible 16 (this did not always occur and matches sometimes continued). If the bouts were 8–8, touches received was used to determine the winning team. (Because double-loss bouts were possible, these victory conditions were adjusted where necessary.) Pool matches unnecessary to the result were not played.

Rosters

Argentina
 Vito Simonetti
 Antonio Villamil
 Raúl Saucedo
 Floro Díaz
 Jorge Balza
 Adolfo Guido Lavalle

Belgium
 Raymond Stasse
 Léopold Hauben
 Raymond Bru
 Jean-Marie Radoux
 Raoul Henkart
 Charles Debeur

Brazil
 Mario Biancalana
 Fortunato de Barros
 Henrique de Aguilar
 Walter de Paula
 Salvatore Scianamea

Canada
 Robert Desjarlais
 Alf Horn
 Roland Asselin
 Georges Pouliot

Cuba
 Roberto Mañalich
 Carlos Lamar
 Armando Barrientos
 Juan Antonio Martínez

Denmark
 Mogens Lüchow
 Erik Andersen
 Ib Nielsen
 René Dybkær
 Jakob Lyng
 Kenneth Flindt

Egypt
 Salah Dessouki
 Jean Asfar
 Mahmoud Younes
 Mohamed Abdel Rahman
 Osman Abdel Hafeez

Finland
 Nils Sjöblom
 Olavi Larkas
 Erkki Kerttula
 Ilmari Vartia
 Kauko Jalkanen

France
 Henri Guérin
 Henri Lepage
 Marcel Desprets
 Michel Pécheux
 Édouard Artigas
 Maurice Huet

Great Britain
 Charles de Beaumont
 Terry Beddard
 Ronald Parfitt
 Archibald Craig
 Michael McCready
 Bert Pelling

Greece
 Athanasios Nanopoulos
 Andreas Skotidas
 Stefanos Zintzos
 Konstantinos Bembis
 Ioannis Karamazakis

Hungary
 Imre Hennyei
 Pál Dunay
 Béla Rerrich
 Béla Mikla
 Lajos Balthazár
 Béla Bay

Italy
 Edoardo Mangiarotti
 Carlo Agostoni
 Dario Mangiarotti
 Gino Cantone
 Marco Antonio Mandruzzato
 Fiorenzo Marini

Luxembourg
 Jean-Fernand Leischen
 Paul Anen
 Émile Gretsch
 Gust Lamesch
 Erny Putz

Mexico
 Emilio Meraz
 Francisco Valero
 Benito Ramos
 Antonio Haro

Norway
 Johan von Koss
 Egill Knutzen
 Alfred Eriksen
 Claus Mørch Sr.
 Sverre Gillebo

Poland
 Antoni Sobik
 Rajmund Karwicki
 Jan Nawrocki
 Teodor Zaczyk
 Bolesław Banaś

Portugal
 Manuel Chagas
 José de Castro
 Emílio Lino
 Álvaro Pinto
 João Costa
 Carlos Dias

Sweden
 Sven Thofelt
 Per Carleson
 Frank Cervell
 Carl Forssell
 Bengt Ljungquist
 Arne Tollbom

Switzerland
 Fernand Thiébaud
 Robert Lips
 Jean Hauert
 Oswald Zappelli
 Otto Rüfenacht
 Marc Chamay

United States
 Norman Lewis
 Andrew Boyd
 Joe de Capriles
 Donald Thompson
 Albert Wolff
 Ralph Goldstein

Results

Round 1

The top two teams in each pool advanced to round 2.

Pool 1

Argentina beat Poland 10–6, Poland beat Cuba 8–6, and Argentina beat Cuba 9–5.

Pool 2

Belgium defeated Mexico 10–6, Denmark beat Canada 13–2, Belgium beat Canada 12–1, and Denmark defeated Mexico 9–2.

Pool 3

The United States (9–5) and Luxembourg (8–6) each defeated Finland.

Pool 4

Chile withdrew before competition, leaving France and Norway to advance.

Pool 5

Italy (14–2) and Great Britain (8–6) each defeated Brazil.

Pool 6

Egypt (10–5) and Switzerland (8–6) each defeated Portugal.

Pool 7

Sweden (16–0) and Hungary (9–1) each defeated Greece.

Round 2

The top two teams in each pool advanced to the semifinals.

Pool 1

Italy beat Poland 14–1, Hungary beat Norway 7–7 (34–35 touches against), Italy beat Norway 12–2, and Hungary beat Poland 10–6.

Pool 2

France defeated Denmark 12–4, Egypt beat Great Britain 11–5, France beat Great Britain 12–3, Denmark beat Egypt 8–6, France defeated Egypt 8–5, and Denmark defeated Great Britain 8–4.

Pool 3

Switzerland (11–3) and Sweden (9–3) each defeated Argentina.

Pool 4

Belgium (9–5) and Luxembourg (8–6) each defeated the United States.

Semifinals

The top two teams in each pool advanced to the final.

Semifinal 1

This semifinal was one of the more chaotic of the tournament, as Belgium defeated the heavy favorite France but also lost to the last-place Switzerland.

Denmark beat Poland 7–6, France beat Switzerland 12–3, Belgium defeated France 10–5, Denmark beat Switzerland 12–3, Switzerland beat Belgium 7–7 (33–39 touches against), and France beat Denmark 7–5.

Semifinal 2

Sweden defeated Hungary 15–0, Italy beat Luxembourg 11–4, Sweden beat Luxembourg 11–3, and Italy defeated Hungary 8–1.

Final

In the first pairings, France defeated Sweden 11–4 and Italy beat Denmark 12–4. The second pairings saw the favorites again win, with France 9–1 over Denmark and Italy 8–6 over Sweden. The Sweden-Denmark match was thus a de facto bronze medal match, with Sweden winning 8–7. France defeated Italy 11–5 to take the gold medal.

References

Epee team
Men's events at the 1948 Summer Olympics